The Mandalay Cultural Museum is a museum located at the corner of 80th Road and 24th Street, in Mandalay, Myanmar.

It displays objects of past ministers over the centuries, including materials and furniture used by King Mindon and King Thibaw, paintings by Royal artist Saya Chone and sculptures.

The museum charges US$2 to foreign visitors. For Burmese people, the charge is 500 Kyats for adults and 250 kyats for children.

It is open from 10:00 am to 3:30 pm from Tuesday to Sunday.

References

Museums in Myanmar
Mandalay